Shooting competitions at the 2011 Pan American Games in Guadalajara were held from October 15 to October 23 at the Pan American Shooting Polygon (rifle and pistol events) and Jalisco Hunting Club (shotgun events). Shooting is one of the many sports offering Olympic qualification.

Medal summary

Medal table

Men's events

Women's events

Schedule
All times are Central Daylight Time (UTC-5).

Summary
The following countries have earned quotas:

References

 
Events at the 2011 Pan American Games
P
2011
Shooting competitions in Mexico